Eric Orchard is a Canadian illustrator and cartoonist. He grew up in Halifax, Nova Scotia where he began illustrating stories while still in grade school. Orchard studied painting and art history at the Nova Scotia College of Art and Design. He has illustrated three critically acclaimed children's books and has been twice nominated for the Atlantic Book Awards' Lillian Shepherd Memorial Award (for Excellence in Illustration) for his work on A Forest for Christmas (2008) and The Terrible, Horrible, Smelly Pirate (2009). In 2008, he was among the select artists chosen to contribute to The Totoro Forest Project charity art auction. In 2010, his work was showcased in The Society of Illustrators annual exhibit and he was featured in the Spectrum Annual of Fantastic Art. Orchard was awarded silver in the comics category in Spectrum 17. His art has also appeared in GUD Magazine

Bibliography
 The Terrible, Horrible, Smelly Pirate (written by Carrie Muller and Jacqueline Halsey, Nimbus Publishing)
 Anything but Hank (written by Rachel Lebowitz and Zachariah Wells, Biblioasis)
 A Forest for Christmas (written by Michael Harris, Nimbus Publishing, 
 Maddy Kettle: The Adventure of the Thimblewitch, Top Shelf Productions (2014),

External links

Top Shelf's Maddy Kettle website
Totoro Forest Project

Articles
"Eric Orchard wins Spectrum Award"

Awards
Spectrum 17 Award Winners
Atlantic Book Awards Shortlist 2009
Atlantic Book Awards Shortlist 2008

Interviews
Lines and Colors with Eric Orchard
Seven Impossible Things Before Breakfast interview

Notes and references

Living people
Canadian illustrators
NSCAD University alumni
Year of birth missing (living people)